Leslie Hairston (born July 17, 1961) is an American politician who is currently alderman of the 5th ward of the City of Chicago; she was elected in 1999. Hairston is a Hyde Park native. As alderman, she represents the ward in the Chicago City Council along with representatives from the 49 other Chicago wards. She was re-elected in 2003, 2007, 2011, 2015 and 2019.

Early life
Hairston was born in Chicago and grew up in the Hyde Park and South Shore neighborhoods. She is an alumna of the University of Chicago Lab Schools. Hariston earned her bachelor's degree from the University of Wisconsin, and her J.D. degree from Loyola University School of Law. Before becoming alderman, Hairston was in a private law practice.

Public service
 Hairston worked in Springfield as an Assistant Attorney General. She also handled litigation for the office of the Illinois Attorney's Appellate Prosecutor's Office, where she argued before the Illinois Supreme Court. She is a member of the South Shore Cultural Center Advisory Council, the Jackson Park Advisory Council, and the O'Keeffe Area Council. She was a member of the McFarland Mental Health Center with the Illinois Department of Mental Health and Development Disabilities and a former beat facilitator for CAPS. Hairston is also a member of Alpha Kappa Alpha sorority.

Aldermanic career
Hairston was elected in 1999, when she defeated an incumbent in her first race. She sits on five committees: Buildings; Rules and Ethics; Human Relations; Parks and Recreation; and Special Events and Cultural Affairs. Between January 2008 and July 2009, Hairston hired Chicago political consultant Delmarie Cobb to prepare newsletters and news releases and to publicize ward meetings for the alderman, and paid Cobb thousands of dollars from Hairston's campaign fund, as well as nearly $28,000 from a taxpayer-funded payroll account, available to aldermen with no scrutiny.

Hairston was one of only five Chicago aldermen to oppose the privatization of Chicago parking meters.

In October 2014, Hairston offered her Facebook followers prizes if they went and voted on November 4. "Vote–you're eligible no matter the candidate," the Facebook post read. "Then put their name and contact information on the back of their voter receipt…. And stop by the Fifth Ward office and drop it off." An election attorney told Chicago Fox News that Hairston's post violated election law because it constituted "vote buying". According to the law a candidate cannot offer anything of value including money to entice someone to vote one way or the other or simply just to vote. Hairston soon took the post down.

Hairston is a member of the Council's Progressive Reform Caucus.

In the 2019 Chicago mayoral election, Hairston endorsed Toni Preckwinkle, declaring her support for her in advance of the first round of the election upon Preckwinkle's entrance into the mayoral race.

On August 26, 2022, Hairston announced that she would not run for re-election in the 2023 election, retiring at the end of her term.

References

External links

 Alderman Lesile Hairston's biography page on the City of Chicago's website

1961 births
21st-century American politicians
21st-century American women politicians
Chicago City Council members
Living people
Loyola University Chicago School of Law alumni
University of Chicago Laboratory Schools alumni
University of Wisconsin–Madison alumni
Women city councillors in Illinois
Illinois Democrats